
Gmina Sorkwity is a rural gmina (administrative district) in Mrągowo County, Warmian-Masurian Voivodeship, in northern Poland.

Villages
Gmina Sorkwity contains the villages and settlements of Bałowo, Borowe, Borowski Las, Burszewo, Choszczewo, Gieląd Mały, Gizewo, Głodowo, Janiszewo, Janowo, Jędrychowo, Jełmuń, Karczewiec, Kozarek Mały, Kozarek Wielki, Kozłowo, Lesiny, Maradki, Maradzki Chojniak, Miłuki, Młynik, Nibork, Nowy Gieląd, Piłaki, Pustniki, Rodowe, Rozogi, Rybno, Słomowo, Sorkwity, Stama, Stary Gieląd, Surmówka, Szarłaty, Szelągówka, Szymanowo, Tyszkowo, Warpuny, Wilamówko, Wola Maradzka, Załuki, Zamkowo and Zyndaki.

Neighbouring gminas
Gmina Sorkwity is bordered by the gminas of Biskupiec, Dźwierzuty, Kolno, Mrągowo, Piecki and Reszel.

References
Polish official population figures 2006

Sorkwity
Mrągowo County